The Hausa–Gwandara languages (also known as the A.1 West Chadic languages) of the Afro-Asiatic family are spoken principally in Niger and Nigeria. They include Gwandara and Hausa, the most populous Chadic language and a major language of West Africa.

Languages
The two Hausa–Gwandara languages are:

Hausa
Gwandara

Classification within West Chadic
Based on nominal morphology and other grammatical patterns, Blench (2021) considers the Hausa–Gwandara branch to have been the first West Chadic branch to have split off from Proto-West Chadic.

Non-Chadic influences
The Hausa–Gwandara languages have many words that are not found in other Chadic languages because they are loans from Adamawa, Plateau, Kainji, Nupoid, and other Benue-Congo languages acquired during its expansion across the Nigerian Middle Belt. While those languages became assimilated, many of their words had changed the lexicon of Hausa. Some likely influence from vanished Nilo-Saharan languages on Hausa has been proposed.

List of Hausa words of likely Benue-Congo origin:

References

West Chadic languages
Languages of Nigeria